Rinata Sultanova (born 17 March 1998) is a Kazakhstani cyclist. She won the gold medal in the women's individual pursuit, women's scratch and women's omnium events at the 2021 Islamic Solidarity Games held in Konya, Turkey.

Sultanova won the silver medal in the women's scratch event at the 2020 Asian Track Cycling Championships held in South Korea. She competed in the women's scratch and women's omnium events at the 2020 UCI Track Cycling World Championships held in Berlin, Germany. She also competed in the women's elimination and women's omnium events at the 2021 UCI Track Cycling World Championships held in Roubaix, France.

In 2022, she won medals at the Asian Road Cycling Championships held in Dushanbe, Tajikistan and at the Asian Track Cycling Championships held in New Delhi, India.

References

External links 

 

Living people
1998 births
Place of birth missing (living people)
Kazakhstani female cyclists
Kazakhstani track cyclists
Islamic Solidarity Games medalists in cycling
Islamic Solidarity Games competitors for Kazakhstan
21st-century Kazakhstani women